Xhemail Mustafa (August 23, 1953 – November 23, 2000) was a Kosovo journalist and prominent political advisor to Ibrahim Rugova, President of Kosovo.

History

Xhemail Mustafa (born on August 23, 1953 in the village of Glamnik, Podujevo, FPR Yugoslavia) was a political advisor of Ibrahim Rugova (Kosovo President) and a member of the Democratic League of Kosovo (LDK). He was shot dead by two unknown gunman in his apartment entrance stairwell in Pristina on 23 November 2000.

From 1997 to the time of his death, Mustafa was the senior media advisor to President Rugova, following a period as the spokesperson for the Democratic League of Kosovo.

Mustafa had long been an advocate of non-violent dissent.  At the time of his assassination, he had recently written newspaper columns denouncing the criminal violence in Kosovo that had arisen following the 1999 cessation of hostilities in the Kosovo War.

Mustafa's assassination occurred a month after the Democratic League of Kosovo had won the largest share of votes in the municipal elections, resulting in the removal from office of members of three rival political parties formed from the Kosovo Liberation Army.  Mustafa's assassination was the third such murder in two months, following the killings, by the same method, of a prominent Albanian architect and a prominent Albanian journalist.

In 2012, it was reported that authorities were close to arresting Mustafa's assassins, who were identified as a legislative member and a police officer.

In Mustafa's honour, a primary school just steps from where he died bears his name.

References

1954 births
2000 deaths
Politicians from Podujevo
Kosovo Albanians
Democratic Party of Kosovo politicians
Kosovan murder victims